The year 1707 in music involved some significant events.

Events
George Frideric Handel meets Domenico Scarlatti in Venice.
Antonio Caldara leaves his post in Mantua to become maestro di cappella to Prince Ruspoli in Rome.
Domenico Zipoli becomes a pupil of organist Giovani Maria Casini in Florence.
October 17 – Johann Sebastian Bach marries his second cousin, Maria Barbara Bach, at Dornheim.
December 1 – English composer and organist Jeremiah Clarke commits suicide in London. He is succeeded as Master of the Children of the Chapel Royal by William Croft.

Published classical music
Tomaso Albinoni – 12 Concerti a cinque, Op. 5
 Francesco Antonio Bonporti – 10 Violin Sonatas, Op. 7
 Michel de La Barre – Pièces en trio, Livre 3
 Pierre Gautier – Symphonies divisées par suites de tons
 Elisabeth Jacquet de la Guerre 
 Pièces de clavecin, Livre 2
 6 Violin Sonatas
Michele Mascitti – 12 Violin Sonatas, Op. 3
Nicolas Siret – Pièces de Clavecin, Livre 1

Published popular music
Hymns and Spiritual Songs by Isaac Watts (including "When I Survey the Wondrous Cross")

Classical music

Johann Bernhard Bach  
Helft mir Gottes Güte greifen
Jesus nichts als Jesus
Johann Sebastian Bach  
Christ lag in Todes Banden, BWV 4 (chorale cantata)
Gottes Zeit ist die allerbeste Zeit, BWV 106
Fugue (on the theme 'B-A-C-H') in C major, BWV Anh.107
Aus der Tiefe rufe ich, Herr, zu dir, BWV 131
Der Herr denket an uns, BWV 196
Prelude and Fugue in A minor, BWV 551
Toccata and Fugue in C major, BWV 566a
Fugue in G minor, BWV 578
Capriccio in E major, BWV 993
 Michel Richard Delalande – Cantate Domino canticum novum, S. 72
 Henri Desmarets – Confitebor tibi Domine
 Giovanni Battista Draghi – 6 Harpsichord Suites
 George Frideric Handel  
 The Alchemist, HWV 43
 Il trionfo del Tempo e della Verità, HWV 46
 Ah, che pur troppo è vero, HWV 77
 Diana cacciatrice, HWV 79
 Allor ch'io dissi addio, HWV 80
 Alpestre monte, HWV 81
 Aure soavi e liete, HWV 84
 Care selve, aure grate, HWV 88
 Clori, degli occhi miei, HWV 91a
 Clori, mia bella Clori, HWV 92
 Clori, Tirsi e Fileno, HWV 96
 Il delirio amoroso, HWV 99
 Armida abbandonata, HWV 105
 Agrippina condotta a morire, HWV 110
 Figli del mesto cor, HWV 112
 Fra pensieri quel pensiero, HWV 115
 Ne' tuoi lumi, o bella Clori, HWV 133
 No se emenderá jamás, HWV 140
 Non sospirar, non piangere, HWV 141
 Notte placida e cheta, HWV 142
 O lucenti, o sereni occhi, HWV 144
 Occhi miei che faceste?, HWV 146
 Poichè giuraro amore, HWV 148
 Qualor l'egre pupille, HWV 152
 Sarei troppo felice, HWV 157
 La bianca rosa, HWV 160a
 Spande ancor a mio dispetto, HWV 165
 Stanco di più soffrire, HWV 167a
 Tra le fiamme, HWV 170
 Un' alma innamorata, HWV 173
 Un sospir a chi si muore, HWV 174
 Vedendo amor, HWV 175
 Venne voglia ad amore, HWV 176
 Giù nei Tartari Regni, HWV 187
 Ah! che troppo ineguali, HWV 230
 Dixit Dominus, HWV 232
 Laudate pueri Dominum, HWV 237
 Nisi Dominus, HWV 238
 Salve Regina, HWV 241
 Sinfonia in B-flat major, HWV 339
 Oboe Sonata in B-flat major, HWV 357
 Trio Sonata in G minor, HWV 391
 Trio Sonata in F major, HWV 405
 Keyboard Sonata in G minor, HWV 580
 Reinhard Keiser – Dialogus von der Geburt Christi
 Michel de La Barre – Suite in E minor, IMB 17
Jean-Baptiste de Lully – Concert donné au soupé du roy
Johann Pachelbel – Kyrie, Gott Vater in Ewigkeit, P. 233
James Paisible – The Union. Mr. Isaac's new dance...
Alessandro Scarlatti  
Ahi che sarà di me, H. 19
Cain, overo Il primo omicidio (oratorio)
Il giardino di rose
Giuseppe Torelli – Sinfonia in D major, G.29

Opera
Thomas Clayton – Rosamond, book by Joseph Addison, produced in London
Nicola Fago – Radamisto
Handel – Rodrigo
Johann Christoph Pepusch – Thomyris, Queen of Scythia
Alessandro Scarlatti – Mitridate Eupatore
Agostino Steffani – Arminio

Births
April 10 – Michel Corrette, organist and composer (died 1795)
May 2 – Jean-Baptiste Barrière, cellist and composer (died 1747)
December 18 – Charles Wesley, hymn-writer (died 1788)
date unknown
Matthew Dubourg, violinist, conductor and composer (died 1767)
Zanetta Farussi, opera singer and composer (died 1776)
Edward Harwood (of Darwen), composer of hymns, anthems and songs (died 1787)
Pietro Domenico Paradisi, composer and harpsichordist (died 1791)
Herman Friedrich Voltmar, composer (died 1782)

Deaths
February 9 – Giuseppe Aldrovandini, composer (born 1665)
March 30 – Henry Hall, composer of church music (born c. 1656)
April 20 – Johann Christoph Denner, inventor of the clarinet (born 1655)
May 9 – Dieterich Buxtehude, composer (born 1637)
June – Gaspard Le Roux, French harpsichordist (born c.1660)
August 20 – Nicolas Gigault, organist and composer (born 1627)
September 5 – Daniel Speer, composer (born 1636)
December 1 – Jeremiah Clarke, composer (born c.1674)
date unknown – Julie d'Aubigny ("La Maupin"), opera singer (born 1670)
probable – Henry Playford, music publisher (born 1657)

References

 
18th century in music
Music by year